was a ryuka poet who was born in Onna, Okinawa, and lived in the 18th century.

About Onna Nabe
Eisho Miyagi thought she had some spiritual power, and she danced as a religious person.

Ryuka
 

Original text
恩納 松下に　禁止の碑 たちゅす 恋 しのぶまでぃの　禁止や ないさめ
恩納岳 あがた 里が 生まれ島 もりも おしのけてぃ こがたなさな
波の 声もとまれ　風の 声もとまれ　首里天がなし　美御機 拝ま

Transliteration

Unna Matyuisitani Tijunufenu Tachusu Kui Shinubumadinu Tijiya Naisami
Unnadaki Agata Satoga Umarijima Morimo Oshinuketi Kugatanasana
Naminu Kuemotomare Kazenu Kuemotomare Shuitinganashi Miunki Ogama

Translation
There stands a notice board of forbidding something under a pine tree of Onna Village.  I hope the authorities are not forbidding affection between man and woman
Over Mount Onna, there is a village where my lover lives. I would like to push away the woods, and draw the village near to me
Be quiet, the sea waves. Be quiet, the sounds of the wind, Everyone. Bow the King and see his face

Ryuka on Onna Nabe
 

Original text
間暮の 空に 立ちゅる 恩納岳
しばし 眺めゆん なべゆ 思てぃ
明仁

Transliteration
Yumanguwinu Shurani Tachuru Unnadaki
Shibashi Nagameyun Nabeyu Umuti

Translation
Mount Onna stands clearly against the darkening sky
I watch it for some time, thinking of Onna Nabe (Akihito, 1987)

Footnotes

References
Kei Higa Okinawa Encyclopedia 1983, Okinawa Times, Naha, jou, chu, ge.
Munekatsu Yaka Ryukyu Bungaku, Folklore studies on Ryuka 1995 Kindai Bungeisha, Tokyo.
屋嘉宗克　琉球文学　琉歌の民俗学的研究　1995　近代文芸社　東京
Nihon Shodō Bijutukan, Ryuka, the heart of songs of the Southern Island, 1992,　Nihonshodou Shuppankyoukai,  Tokyo.
日本書道美術館　琉歌ー南島のうたの心、1992, 日本書道出版協会、東京

External links
 Ryuka

Ryukyuan people
People of the Ryukyu Kingdom